Viimsi is a small borough in Harju County, Estonia, about  northeast of the centre of Tallinn, just north of Tallinn's subdistrict Merivälja. Viimsi is the administrative centre of Viimsi Parish. As of the 2011 census, its population was 2,341.

Viimsi Manor, which was established by St. Brigitta Nunnery (in Pirita), was first mentioned in 1471 as Wiems. After the Great Northern War, the manor had multiple owners, among them the Stenbock, Buxhoeveden, Maydell and Schottländer families. After the dispossession in 1919 the manor was given to the Commander-in-chief of the Estonian Army, General Johan Laidoner, who owned it until 1940. During World War II, it was used by the Red Army. Since 2001, the building has housed the National War Museum of Estonia (also the Museum of General Laidoner).

In 2017, former Prime Minister Siim Kallas was elected municipal mayor of Vimsii.

References

External links
Viimsi Parish 
The Estonian War Museum – General Laidoner Museum
Viimsi Manor at the Estonian Manors Portal

Boroughs and small boroughs in Estonia